Major-General Sir James Keith Trotter  (24 July 1849 – 30 September 1940) was a senior British Army officer.

Military career
Educated at Rossall School, Durham School and the Royal Military Academy, Woolwich, Trotter was commissioned into the Royal Artillery on 7 January 1870.

He became Deputy Director of Mobilisation and Military Intelligence at the War Office in 1903, Brigadier in charge of Administration at Western Command in 1905 and commander of the troops in Sierra Leone in September 1906. He went on to be General Officer Commanding the South Coast Defences in April 1908 and retired from the army in July 1911 before taking up a civilian role in the Secret Intelligence Service where he set up G (German) Branch to expose subversion among trade unionists and pacifists.

He was recalled to become General Officer Commanding 62nd (2nd West Riding) Division in February 1915 during the First World War. He handed over his command and returned to retirement in December 1915.

Family
In 1878 he married Alice Crow; they had one son, James Keith.

James served as a Lieutenant in the Gordon Highlanders during the Great War. He was killed in action on 26 August 1914 and is buried in Caudry British Cemetery in France.

References

1849 births
1940 deaths
British Army generals of World War I
Knights Commander of the Order of the Bath
Companions of the Order of St Michael and St George
Royal Artillery officers
People educated at Rossall School
People educated at Durham School
Graduates of the Royal Military Academy, Woolwich
British Army major generals